The 2016–17 Colgate Raiders men's basketball team represented Colgate University during the 2016–17 NCAA Division I men's basketball season. The Raiders, led by sixth-year head coach Matt Langel, played their home games at Cotterell Court in Hamilton, New York as members of the Patriot League. They finished the season 10–22, 8–10 in Patriot League play to finish in a tie for sixth place. As the No. 6 seed in the Patriot League tournament, they lost in the quarterfinals to Lehigh.

Previous season
The Raiders finished the 2015–16 season 13–17, 9–9 in Patriot League play to finish in four-way tie for fourth place. They lost in the quarterfinals of the Patriot League tournament to Army.

Departures

Incoming recruits

2017 class recruits

Roster

Schedule and results

|-
!colspan=9 style=| Non-conference regular season

|-
!colspan=9 style=| Patriot League regular season

|-
!colspan=9 style=| Patriot League tournament

References

Colgate Raiders men's basketball seasons
Colgate
Colgate
Colgate